The Nizhny Novgorod Synagogue serves the Jewish community of the Russian city of Nizhny Novgorod, which currently numbers over 10,000 people. It is located at 5a Gruzinskaya Street.

The Jewish population of the city grew rapidly during the 19th and early 20th centuries, rising from 300 people in 1850 to some 3000 people in 1913. The city accepted many Jewish refugees after the First World War and Russian Civil War, swelling its number by some 15,000 people. The synagogue was built in the period from 1881 to 1883. The synagogue was led by a rabbi and a chief rabbi. There they formed a yeshiva and held charitable and funeral services.

Despite the increase of Jewish refugees in Nizhny Novgorod, government policy was aimed at reducing the Jewish population in the Nizhny Novgorod region. The policy of the Soviet regime towards Jews was dual. On the one hand, community institutions were abolished, and atheism was propagated. On the other hand, the government attempted to control accused anti-Semitism and fought against pogroms. For the most part, however, the propagation of atheism had the greater effect on Jewish church organisation, and as a result the synagogue's social role diminished along with the services it provided. By 1938 the synagogue, club and national society had been abolished.

With glasnost during the late 1980s and the subsequent fall of the Soviet government, the Jewish community of Nizhny Novgorod experienced a renaissance. A Club of Jewish Culture was established in 1989, and a religious community was registered. On 18 May 1991 the synagogue building was returned to the community, and services resumed later the same year. The synagogue is once again the centre of the city's Jewish community, and is involved in the organisation of a wide range of services, including schools and youth clubs, and social aid programmes such as a soup kitchen and drug and alcohol addiction prevention and support schemes. The synagogue is currently run by Rabbi Shimon Bergman.

References

External links
Official website
Nizhny Novgorod Jewish community website

Synagogue
Synagogues in Russia